Windtalkers is a 2002 American war film directed and co-produced by John Woo, starring Nicolas Cage, Adam Beach, Peter Stormare, Noah Emmerich, Mark Ruffalo, and Christian Slater. It is based on the real story of Navajo code talkers during World War II. The film was theatrically released in the United States on June 14, 2002, and received mixed reviews and proved to be financially unsuccessful, grossing just $77.6 million worldwide against a production budget of $115 million.

Plot

During World War II, US Marine corporal Joseph F. "Joe" Enders returns to active duty after having survived a gruesome battle on the Solomon Islands against the Imperial Japanese Army that killed his entire squad and wounded his left ear. Enders and Sgt. Pete "Ox" Henderson receive new assignments to protect Navajo code talkers Pvt. Ben Yahzee and Pvt. Charlie Whitehorse in a JASCO. 

Yahzee and Whitehorse, childhood friends from the Navajo tribe, are trained to send and receive coded messages that direct artillery fire. Enders and Henderson are instructed to kill their code talkers if capture is imminent so that the code cannot fall into enemy hands. Both Enders and Henderson are less than happy to be babysitting their Navajo codetalkers, and the Navajos also endure racial harassment by some of the white Marines, notably Private Chick. During their missions, however, Henderson and Whitehorse discover a mutual love of music. Enders and Yahzee also find that they have much in common, notably their Catholic upbringings.

The invasion of Saipan in the Mariana Islands becomes Yahzee's and Whitehorse's first combat experience. After the beachhead is secured, the Marines come under friendly fire from U.S. artillery. With Yahzee's radio destroyed and the convoy unable to call off the bombardment, Yahzee suggests disguising himself as a Japanese soldier and slip behind enemy lines to commandeer a radio, with Enders as his prisoner. Yahzee is forced to kill for the first time before he can redirect U.S. artillery fire onto the Japanese position. For their bravery, Enders is awarded a Silver Star by the commanding officer, with Yahzee's role almost ignored until Enders points him out.

That night, the Marines camp in the nearby village of Tanapag. As Yahzee is temporarily assigned back to the command post to translate a code, Enders becomes increasingly torn over killing Yahzee and following his orders, but his request to be relieved from duty is denied. The next morning, Japanese soldiers ambush the village. Henderson is killed and Whitehorse is about to be captured. Realizing that the Japanese will torture him for the code, Enders throws a grenade at Whitehorse, killing him and his captors. Yahzee returns to Tanapag and, seeing Whitehorse's body, screams at Enders to explain what happened. When Enders mutters that he killed Whitehorse, an outraged Yahzee aims his weapon at Enders but cannot bring himself to kill him. Enders later confesses that he hated having to kill Whitehorse and that, like Henderson, his mission was to protect the code above all else.

The Marines are sent on another mission and once again ambushed, this time near a deadly minefield on Mount Tapochau, during which many Marines are killed. Enders, Yahzee, Chick, and Cpl. Pappas (the last of the Marines) take cover on a ridge and see Japanese artillery fire from the top of the ridge attacking a Marine convoy below their position. Still enraged over Whitehorse's death, Yahzee charges the Japanese line, killing many Japanese soldiers. Yahzee and Enders are both shot as they call in an airstrike on the Japanese artillery. However, surrounded and knowing the Japanese will capture and torture him for the code as they almost did with Whitehorse, Yahzee begs Enders to kill him. Enders, determined that no one else will die that day, manages to carry Yahzee to safety. Friendly planes arrive and the Japanese position is successfully destroyed. Yahzee rejoices in their success though Enders, mortally wounded, dies.

Back in the U.S., Yahzee and his family sit atop Point Mesa in Monument Valley, Arizona, and, wearing the sacred necklaces and Navajo ceremonial dress, perform the Navajo ritual of paying their respects to Enders.

An epilogue states that the Navajo code was crucial to America's successes against Japan across the Pacific theater during the war and that like all other Native American codes, the Navajo code was never broken.

Cast
 Nicolas Cage as Sergeant Joe Enders
 Adam Beach as Private Ben Yahzee
 Peter Stormare as Gunnery Sergeant Richard Hjelmsted, Platoon Sergeant
 Noah Emmerich as Private First Class Charles "Chick" Clusters, a BAR gunner
 Mark Ruffalo as Corporal Milo Pappas, a rifleman
 Christian Slater as Sergeant Peter "Ox" Henderson
 Roger Willie as Private Charlie Whitehorse
 Brian Van Holt as Private Andrew Harrigan, the flamethrower man
 Martin Henderson as Private Thomas Nellie, a rifleman
 Frances O'Connor as Pharmacist's Mate 2nd Class Rita
 Scott Atkinson as Camp Tarawa Staff Sergeant
 Jason Isaacs as Major Mellitz

Production
Filming locations on Hawaii included Kualoa Ranch, the location where Lost and Jurassic Park were shot. To portray the Marines in the film the producers recruited extras that were volunteers from Schofield Barracks Army Base, Hickam Air Force Base, Pearl Harbor Naval Station, and Kaneohe Marine Corps Air Station. Some of the actual Marines from 4th Force Recon Company were used in the film portraying their actual job. Some violence was trimmed in order to avoid an NC-17 rating. This violence trim was restored for the Director's cut released on DVD running 153 minutes. The film's release date was moved from November 9, 2001, to June 14, 2002.

For the F6F Hellcat fighters that appear in the beach-landing scenes on Saipan, the producers used computer-generated versions.

Reception

Box office
The film was a box office bomb, grossing only under $41 million at the US box-office and a total of $77.6 million worldwide, against a production budget of $115 million.

Critical response
On Rotten Tomatoes the film has an approval rating of 33% based on reviews from 166 critics. The site's consensus states: "The action sequences are expertly staged. Windtalkers, however, sinks under too many clichés and only superficially touches upon the story of the code talkers." On Metacritic the film has a score of 51% based on reviews from 35 critics, indicating "mixed or average reviews". Audiences surveyed by CinemaScore gave the film a grade B+ on scale of A to F.

Roger Ebert of the Chicago Sun-Times gave the film 2 out of 4 stars, remarking that "the filmmakers have buried it beneath battlefield cliches, while centering the story on a white character played by Nicolas Cage". Robert Koehler of Variety called it "A powerful premise turned into a stubbornly flat, derivative war movie."

The film was criticized for featuring the Navajo characters only in supporting roles; they were not the primary focus of the film. The film was ranked number four on Careeraftermilitary.com's "10 Most Inaccurate Military Movies Ever Made" which also included The Patriot, The Hurt Locker, U-571, The Green Berets, Pearl Harbor, Battle of the Bulge, Red Tails, Enemy at the Gates and Flyboys on its list of falsified war movie productions.

About the response, John Woo said: "The main themes of Windtalkers are friendship and understanding. Unfortunately, the studio wanted a John Wayne movie, just a typical American hero film with explosions every few minutes. I had to make them understand that this wasn't a story about heroes. It's a story about a man and his own demons, trying to redeem himself from war. I made the movie that way, but some people in the studio didn't appreciate it and, in the end, I guess neither did the audience."

Accolades

See also

 Code talker
 List of box office bombs
 Native Americans and World War II

References

External links

 
 
 
 
  A documentary exploring issues relating to Department of Defense involvement in film production.
  (includes a dictionary of the code)
 

2002 films
2000s war films
Cryptography in fiction
Films scored by James Horner
Films about language
Films about Native Americans
Films directed by John Woo
Films set in the 1940s
Films set in the Solomon Islands
Films set in the Northern Mariana Islands
Films shot in Hawaii
Films shot in California
Films shot in Utah
Pacific War films
Films about the United States Marine Corps
American war drama films
Metro-Goldwyn-Mayer films
Navajo code talkers
World War II films based on actual events
2000s English-language films
2000s American films